The 2023 season is Albirex Niigata Singapore FC's 20th consecutive season in the top flight of Singapore football and in the S.League, having joined the Sleague in 2004. Along with the 2023 Singapore Premier League, the club will also compete in the Singapore Cup.

The female team will be playing in the Women's Premier League (Singapore).

Squad

SPL Squad

U19 Squad

Coaching staff

Transfer

In

Pre-season

Note 1: .

Loan In 
Pre-season

Loan Return 
Pre-season

Out
Pre-season

Loan Out

Retained / Extension / Promoted

Rumours
Pre-Season

Friendly

Pre-season

In Season friendlies

Notes

Team statistics

Appearances and goals
As at 19 Mar 2023

Appearances and goals (Women)

Competitions

Overview

Charity Shield

Singapore Premier League

Singapore Cup

Group

Competition (U21)

Stage 1

 League table

See Also 
 2014 Albirex Niigata Singapore FC season
 2015 Albirex Niigata Singapore FC season
 2016 Albirex Niigata Singapore FC season
 2017 Albirex Niigata Singapore FC season
 2018 Albirex Niigata Singapore FC season
 2019 Albirex Niigata Singapore FC season
 2020 Albirex Niigata Singapore FC season
 2021 Albirex Niigata Singapore FC season
 2022 Albirex Niigata Singapore FC season
 2022 Albirex Niigata (S) Women season
 2023 Albirex Niigata (S) Women

References

Albirex Niigata Singapore FC
Albirex Niigata Singapore FC seasons
2023
1